JCL may refer to:

Business
Juniperus Capital Limited, a Bermuda-based hedge fund

Computing
 Job Control Language, a scripting language used on IBM mainframe operating systems
 Java Class Library
 Jakarta Commons Logging, a logging utility

Periodicals
 University of Pennsylvania Journal of Constitutional Law
 Journal of Commonwealth Literature
 Journal of Corporation Law
Journal of Chinese Linguistics

Junior Classical League
 The National Junior Classical League (NJCL) or any of its state-level affiliates
 JCL holds many conventions per year, including art, academic tests, and a game called Certamen

Transportation
 České Budějovice Airport, České Budějovice, Czechia, IATA code

Academic
 J.C.L., degree of Licentiate of Canon Law

An oil-producing plant
 Jatropha curcas (abbreviation of Jatropha curcas Linnaeus)

Other
 Journal of Cosmetic & Laser Therapy